Dorismond is a Haitian family name. It can refer to:
 Bigga Haitian (form  (born 1964), stage name of Charles Andre Dorismond, a Haitian musician and singer
 Patrick Dorismond (1974 – 2000), American security guard who was killed by undercover police
 Shirley Dorismond, Canadian politician and former union leader and nurse